Abdelati El Guesse (born 27 February 1993) is a Moroccan middle-distance runner competing primarily in the 800 metres. He represented his country at the 2015 World Championships in Beijing without advancing from the first round. In addition, he won the silver medal at the 2015 Summer Universiade.

At the 2020 Summer Olympics, he competed in the men's 800 metres event.

His personal best in the event is 1:44.84, set in Tokyo in 2021.

Competition record

References

External links
 
 
 
 

1993 births
Living people
Moroccan male middle-distance runners
Olympic athletes of Morocco
Athletes (track and field) at the 2016 Summer Olympics
World Athletics Championships athletes for Morocco
Universiade medalists in athletics (track and field)
Place of birth missing (living people)
Universiade silver medalists for Morocco
Medalists at the 2015 Summer Universiade
Athletes (track and field) at the 2020 Summer Olympics
Athletes (track and field) at the 2022 Mediterranean Games
Mediterranean Games competitors for Morocco